RER NG (French: RER Nouvelle Génération, English: RER New Generation) is a double-deck, dual-voltage electric multiple unit trainset that is currently under construction. Also known as the Class Z 58000 and Class Z 58500, the trainsets are expected to operate on line D and line E of the Réseau Express Régional (RER), a hybrid suburban commuter and rapid transit system serving Paris and its Île-de-France suburbs.

The trainsets were built by a consortium of French manufacturer Alstom and Canadian conglomerate Bombardier. The RER NG is considered to be a part of Alstom's X'Trapolis Duplex platform and is an evolution of several generations of double-deck trainsets built by the consortium, including the Z 2N, MI 2N, and MI 09 series.

History
As Île-de-France Mobilités and SNCF prepared to extend the RER E line west across Paris, the agencies issued a invitation to tender for new trainsets for the line and overall fleet replacement. Several manufacturers responded including a consortium of Alstom and Bombardier, CAF, and Siemens.

Ultimately, the  contract was awarded to Alstom and Bombardier on 6 January 2017. The consortium had previously built several generations of double-deck trainsets, including the Z 2N, MI 2N, and MI 09 series. Similar to those earlier contracts, Alstom would build the two end cars, which contain the cabs, while Bombardier manufactured the intermediate cars. The contract will supply 255 trainsets, 130 for the RER E and 125 for fleet replacement, which are planned to be assigned to the RER D, replacing older trainsets.

In October 2018, Île-de-France Mobilités purchased an additional 64 trainsets for fleet replacement, increasing the total contract to 371 trainsets.

In spring 2020 the first trainset started testing in the Czech Republic.

Description
The design of the RER NG is similar to Bombardier's Regio 2N trainsets with a mix of single and double-deck cars. The single-level end cars are designed to offer level boarding that accommodates disabled passengers who are unable to use stairs and standing passengers traveling short distances. The double-deck intermediate cars accommodate seated passengers traveling longer distances.

RER NG trainsets will have two configurations:

The double-deck intermediate cars will each have two doors per side. The doors located just behind the driving cabs are fitted with gap fillers to enable level boarding for passengers using a mobility device, like a wheelchair.

RER NG trainsets will have open-gangways allowing passengers to travel from one end of the trainset to the other, allowing more an even distribution of passengers on board, reducing crowding during peak periods. Unlike some other open-gangway trainsets, the RER NG will not use a  jacobs bogie between cars, but rather a conventional architecture, each car having two bogies.

Like all RER trains since the MI 84, the RER NG is required to meet strict acceleration standards, being able to fully depart a  platform in 23 seconds. Despite the fact that the RER NG is heavier and up to  longer than a MI 84, it is able to meet this standard with its 8 or 10 motorised bogies.

Formations 
, at least 3 Z58000 trainsets were in tests.

Six-car trainsets are planned for RER E. They will be based at Noisy-le-Sec and Nanterre SNCF depots.

As shown below, they will be formed with four motored cars and two non-powered trailer cars.

 < or > show a pantograph. Cars 1 and 6 are each equipped with one pantograph.
 All cars are connected by gangway.

Seven-car trainsets are planned for RER D. They will be based at Villeneuve and Joncherolles SNCF depots.

As shown below, they will be formed with four motored cars and three non-powered trailer cars.

 < or > show a pantograph. Cars 1 and 7 are each equipped with one pantograph.
 All cars are connected by gangway.

References

Z58000
Electric multiple units of France
Réseau Express Régional multiple units
25 kV AC multiple units
Double-decker EMUs
Alstom multiple units
Bombardier Transportation multiple units
1500 V DC multiple units of France